Mirsad Omerhodžić (born 22 May 1967) is a Croatian football manager and former player.

Playing career
As a player, he started his career at Novi Pazar but it was while playing for another Second Yugoslav League club, Sloboda Užice, that he became noted for having scored 19 league goals in one season. He moved abroad, first to France to play with lower league Rodez, and then to Portugal. His first season he played with Portuguese Liga club Chaves, but after a disappointing season he moved  to Torreense playing in Liga de Honra, second tier. He played his most successful seasons in Portugal between 1994 and 1996, scoring 38 goals (19 each season) and earning his club, Rio Ave, a promotion to the top league. Omer, as Mirsad was known while in Portugal, next moved to Beira-Mar. During the season and a half he spent in Aveiro, he never overcame the disappointment of not returning to the top league, and after some poor displays he moved to Croatia to play with First League club NK Mladost 127. Soon after, he retired from competition and begin his coaching career.

Managerial career
Omerhodžić coached NK Rovinj on three occasions and was named manager of Montenegrin outfit Iskra Danilovgrad in December 2016. He had been coach at Istra Pula earlier as well as been an assistant to Miroslav Blažević at the Bosnia and Herzegovina national team.

References

External links
 
 Stats from Yugoslav Leagues at Zerodic.com

1967 births
Living people
Sportspeople from Pula
Bosniaks of Croatia
Association football forwards
Yugoslav footballers
Croatian footballers
FK Novi Pazar players
FK Sloboda Užice players
Rodez AF players
G.D. Chaves players
S.C.U. Torreense players
Rio Ave F.C. players
S.C. Beira-Mar players
HNK Suhopolje players
Yugoslav Second League players
Primeira Liga players
Croatian Football League players
Yugoslav expatriate footballers
Expatriate footballers in France
Yugoslav expatriate sportspeople in France
Croatian expatriate footballers
Expatriate footballers in Portugal
Croatian expatriate sportspeople in Portugal
Croatian football managers
NK Istra managers
G.D. Interclube managers
FK Iskra Danilovgrad managers
Croatian expatriate football managers
Expatriate football managers in Angola
Expatriate football managers in Montenegro
Croatian expatriate sportspeople in Montenegro
Shanghai Shenhua F.C. non-playing staff